Tilghman Ashurst Howard (November 14, 1797 – August 16, 1844) was an American lawyer, politician, and diplomat from Indiana.  He was born near Easley, South Carolina. He moved to Knoxville, Tennessee, in 1816 and was admitted to the bar there in 1818. In 1830, he moved to Bloomington, Indiana, and in 1833 to Rockville, Indiana. President Andrew Jackson appointed him US Attorney for Indiana, and he served as such from 1833 to 1839. In 1838, he sought, unsuccessfully, to be elected to the U.S. Senate. He was elected to the United States House of Representatives on August 5, 1839, and served until he resigned on July 1, 1840.

In 1841, Tilghman unsuccessfully defended the blacksmith Noah Beauchamp against a murder charge. Beauchamp was convicted and executed in Parke County, Indiana.

He sought election as Governor of Indiana in 1840 and as United States Senator in 1843 but was unsuccessful. He was appointed chargé d'affaires to the Republic of Texas on June 11, 1844, and presented his credentials on August 2, 1844; he served all of two weeks before his untimely death in Washington-on-the-Brazos, Texas, at the age of 46. Tilghman Howard is buried in Rockville, Indiana.

Howard County, Indiana, and Howard County, Iowa, are named in his honor.

References

External links
Biography, U.S. Congress
 (current burial site)
 (cenotaph - original interment site)

1797 births
1844 deaths
People from Indiana in the Mexican–American War
Ambassadors of the United States to the Republic of Texas
Democratic Party members of the United States House of Representatives from Indiana
People from Easley, South Carolina
People from Rockville, Indiana
Politicians from Knoxville, Tennessee
United States Attorneys for the District of Indiana
19th-century American politicians